Anakkayam is an outgrowth of Malappuram city in Kerala, India. A major portion of Pandallur hills (a hill in the central part of Malappuram district, which was the boundary between Eranad and Walluvanad Taluks in Malabar District under British Raj) lie in this area. Anakkayam Grama Panchayat has two revenue villages -Anakkayam and Pandallur.
There are 23 wards in anakkayam gram panchayat

References 

Villages in Malappuram district